Marta Kroutilová (21 September 1925 – 17 April 2017) is a Czechoslovak sprint canoeist who competed in the early 1950s. She finished seventh in the K-1 500 m event at the 1952 Summer Olympics in Helsinki.

She married and her full surname is Kroutilová-Pavlisová.

References

 Marta Kroutilová's profile at Sports Reference.com

1925 births
2017 deaths
Canoeists at the 1952 Summer Olympics
Czechoslovak female canoeists
Czech female canoeists
Olympic canoeists of Czechoslovakia